The 1987–88 Irish League Cup (known as the Roadferry Freight League Cup for sponsorship reasons) was the second edition of Northern Ireland's secondary football knock-out cup competition. It concluded on 28 November 1987 with the final.

Linfield were the defending champions after becoming the first ever winners of the competition the previous season by defeating Crusaders 2–1 in the final. This season they reached the semi-finals, but went out to eventual winners Coleraine, who won the cup with a 1–0 victory over Portadown in the final.

First round

|}

Second round

|}

Quarter-finals

|}

Semi-finals

|}

Final

References

Lea
1987–88 domestic association football cups
1987–88